
Year 346 BC was a year of the pre-Julian Roman calendar. At the time it was known as the Year of the Consulship of Corvus and Visolus (or, less frequently, year 408 Ab urbe condita). The denomination 346 BC for this year has been used since the early medieval period, when the Anno Domini calendar era became the prevalent method in Europe for naming years.

Events 
 By place 

 Greece 
 The Peace of Philocrates is signed between Macedonia and Athens. The document agrees to a return to the status quo, but Philip II of Macedon keeps the right to punish the Phocians for starting the Sacred War.
 The Athenian politicians, Demosthenes and Timarchus, prepare to prosecute Aeschines for treason after he has sought to reconcile the Athenians to Macedonia's expansion into Greece. Eubulus loses his influence on Athenian affairs.
 Demosthenes, though condemning the terms of the Peace of Philocrates, argues that it has to be honoured.
 Following the conclusion of the Peace of Philocrates, Philip II's army moves through the pass of Thermopylae and subdues Phocis. Athens makes no move to support the Phocians.

 Sicily 
 Dionysius II is restored to power in Syracuse.

Births

Deaths

References